William Faulkner (1897—1962) was an American writer who won the 1949 Nobel Prize in Literature. He is best known for his novels and short stories set in the fictional Yoknapatawpha County, a stand-in for his hometown of Oxford in Lafayette County, Mississippi.

Faulkner made his debut as a published writer at the age of 21 with the poem "L'Après-midi d'un Faune", which appeared in The New Republic on August 6, 1919. Two more poems, "Cathay" and "Sapphics" and a short story, "Landing in Luck", were published in Mississippian in November 1919. Many of his earliest works as a student were published in other University of Mississippi publications. While living in New Orleans in 1925, Faulkner published over a dozen short stories in The Times-Picayune, often collectively known as the "New Orleans Sketches". To financially support himself, Faulkner was a prolific short story writer. His works commonly appeared in literary magazines like Scribners and many were published posthumously. In addition to several speeches, Faulkner also wrote several essays on topics ranging from Albert Camus to Japan. 

A year later in 1926, Faulkner's first novel Soldiers' Pay was published. His 19th and final, The Reivers, in 1962, the year he died.

Fiction

Novels

Notable novel compilations
The Portable Faulkner (1946), edited by Malcolm Cowley

To date, Library of America has published all of Faulkner's novels in five volumes, containing restored authoritative texts.
 Novels 1926–1929, containing Soldiers' Pay, Mosquitoes, Flags in the Dust, The Sound and the Fury (1170 pp, April 6, 2006)
 Novels 1930–1935, containing As I Lay Dying, Sanctuary, Light in August, Pylon (1056 pp, December 1, 1985)
 Novels 1936–1940, containing Absalom, Absalom!, The Unvanquished, If I Forget Thee, Jerusalem, The Hamlet (1148 pp, June 1, 1990)
 Novels 1942–1954, containing Go Down, Moses, Intruder in the Dust, Requiem for a Nun, A Fable (1110 pp, October 1, 1994)
 Novels 1957–1962, containing The Town, The Mansion, The Reivers (1020 pp, October 1, 1999)

Short stories

Plays

Screenplays

Produced

Unproduced

Poetry collections

Essays

Book reviews

Introductions

Public letters

Speeches

Notes and references

Citations

Works cited

 

Bibliographies by writer
Bibliographies of American writers
Poetry bibliographies
 
William Faulkner